Bono is a comune (municipality) in the Province of Sassari in the Italian region Sardinia, located about  north of Cagliari and about  southeast of Sassari.

History 
The territory of Bono has been inhabited by man since the Nuraghic age as evidenced by the numerous nuraghi scattered throughout the territory.

References

External links
Official website

Cities and towns in Sardinia